Abubakar Aliyu Nasiru (born October 20, 1990) is a Nigerian football player currently with Kwara United F.C. of Ilorin.

Early life
Hails from Sepi in Giyede local government area of Bauchi State, nurtures the ambition to become a successful professional football player.

Career
Nasiru started his professional football career with El-Kanemi F.C. of Maiduguri in the 2003 season, before joined Kwara United F.C. of Ilorin through the transfer window 2005. A cadet of the Shell Cup 2004.

References

1990 births
Living people
Nigerian footballers
Association football midfielders
El-Kanemi Warriors F.C. players
Kwara United F.C. players